Minneola Manufacturing Company Cloth Warehouse (originally known as Minneola Cotton Mill Cloth Warehouse) is a historic mill complex in Gibsonville, Guilford County, North Carolina.

History 

The complex is a single building, three-story, rectangular brick warehouse built in 1907. The warehouse was doubled in size in 1935 with the erection of a three-story brick expansion to the south of the original block. On the south elevation, the firm added a one-story brick packing room and loading dock in 1953. On the north elevation, a tiny two-story brick addition with bathrooms was constructed in 1977.

In 2018, it got listed on the National Register of Historic Places.

References 

Houses on the National Register of Historic Places in North Carolina
Colonial Revival architecture in North Carolina
Houses completed in 1907
Houses in Guilford County, North Carolina
National Register of Historic Places in Guilford County, North Carolina